The Puzi River is a river in Taiwan. It flows through Chiayi County for 75 km.

See also
List of rivers in Taiwan

References

Rivers of Taiwan
Landforms of Chiayi County